ESS Technology Incorporated  is a private manufacturer of computer multimedia products, Audio DACs and ADCs based in Fremont, California with R&D centers in Kelowna, BC, Canada and Beijing, China. It was founded by  Forrest Mozer in 1983. Robert L. Blair is the CEO and President of the company.

Historically, ESS Technology was most famous for their line of their Audiodrive chips for audio cards. Now they are known for their line of Sabre DAC and ADC products.

History
ESS Technologies was founded in 1983 as Electronic Speech Systems, by Professor Forrest Mozer, a space physicist at the University of California, Berkeley and Todd Mozer, Forrest Mozer's son, and Joe Costello, the former manager of National Semiconductors Digitalker line of talking chips. Costello left soon after the formation and started Cadence Designs with his former boss from National. Fred Chan VLSI designer and software engineer, in Berkeley, California, joined in 1985, and took over running the company in 1986 when Todd Mozer left for graduate school.

The company was created at least partially as a way to market Mozer's speech synthesis system (described in US patents 4,214,125, 4,433,434 and 4,435,831) after his (3-year, summer 1978 to summer 1981, extended) contract with National Semiconductor expired in 1983 or so.

Electronic Speech Systems produced synthetic speech for, among other things, home computer systems like the Commodore 64. Within the hardware limitations of that time, ESS used Mozer's technology, in software, to produce realistic-sounding voices that often became the boilerplate for the respective games. Two popular sound bites from the Commodore 64 were "He slimed me!!" from Ghostbusters and Elvin Atombender's "Another visitor. Stay a while—stay forever!" in the original Impossible Mission.

At some point, the company moved from Berkeley to Fremont, California. Around that time, the company was renamed to ESS Technology.

Later, in 1994, Forrest Mozer's son Todd Mozer, an ESS employee, branched off and started his own company called Sensory Circuits Inc, later Sensory, Inc. to market speech recognition technology.

In the mid-1990s, ESS started working on making PC audio, and later, video chips, and created the Audiodrive line, used in hundreds of different products. Audiodrive chips were at least nominally Creative Sound Blaster Pro compatible. Many Audiodrive chips also featured in-house developed, OPL3-compatible FM synthesizers (branded ESFM Synthesizers). These synthesizers were often reasonably faithful to the Yamaha OPL3 chip, which was an important feature for the time as some competing solutions, including Creative's own CQM synthesis featured in later ISA Sound Blaster compatibles, offered sub-par FM sound quality. Some PCI-interface Audiodrives (namely the ES1938 Solo-1) also provided legacy DOS compatibility through Distributed DMA and the SB-Link interface.

In 2001 ESS acquired a small Kelowna design company (SAS) run by Martin Mallinson and continues R&D operations in Kelowna. The Kelowna R&D Center developed the Sabre range of DAC and ADC products that are used in many audio systems and cell phones.

Founders
Forrest Mozer continues his research work at the University of California, these days as Associate Director of Space Sciences. He was awarded EGU Hannes Alfven Medallist 2004 for his work in electrical field measurement and space plasma and also was involved in building the microphone to record sounds from the Mars Lander. He is a member of the board of directors of Sensory, Inc.

Fred Chan held a number of positions at ESS, and was CEO of Vialta, an internet offshoot of ESS, until his stepping down on July 18, 2007, to pursue philanthropic interests.

Professor Mozer's Patented Technology 
Professor Mozer first became interested in speech technology when a blind student in his class in 1970 asked whether he could help design a talking calculator. Mozer spent 5 years working on it, and his speech technology first appeared in the Telesensory Systems "Speech+" talking calculator, in a chip called the "CRC Chip", more commonly known as s14001a, the first self-contained speech synthesizer chip. This chip was also used in a few arcade games, notably Atari's Wolf Pack, and Stern Electronics' Berzerk and Frenzy, and in several of Stern's pinball machines.

After a three-year exclusive deal with Telesensory Systems from 1975 to 1978, Forrest Mozer sold a 3-year license to National Semiconductor, and they created another chip using Mozer synthesis, the MM54101 "Digitalker". At first, even then, all words were encoded by hand by Mozer in his basement, but in the third or fourth year of the license, National came up with a software encoder for it. After the exclusive license expired (National seemed to have a "non-exclusive" license for a year or so), Mozer licensed the technology to ESS. After Mozer's son Todd split off and created Sensory Circuits Inc., the technology was licensed there.

According to the Sensory Inc. history pages and old datasheets, they offered three types of compression:
 MX (this compression is nearly identical to that used on the Digitalker, with some minor coding changes and possibly some RLE. It's apparently used on some alarm systems and on the Vtech talking baseball/football cards)
 CX
 SX
and a few other PCM/LPC based systems.

Although Sensory bought up the Texas Instruments' speech products, their main focus has been on speech recognition, and not synthesis.

Professor Mozer's technique not only produced very realistic sounding speech, it also required very little on-chip (later, in software) RAM, a sparse and expensive commodity at that time. The advanced compression algorithm (patented, an early form of psychoacoustic compression using similar spectra of ADPCM-encoded waves) reduced the memory footprint of speech about a hundredfold, so one second of speech would require 90 to 625 bytes. With ESS-speech, samples that would normally require almost all of the 64 kilobyte memory of the Commodore 64 (if encoded in PCM) were so small, that the entire game fit into the RAM along with speech, without requiring additional loads from disk.

Games featuring ESS-speech
 Fisher Price Jungle Book Reading (Apple II, 19??)
 Impossible Mission (C64, 1984)
 Ghostbusters (C64, 1984)
 Cave of the Word Wizard (C64, 1984)
 Talking Teacher (C64, 1985)
 Kennedy Approach (C64, 1985)
 Desert Fox (C64, 1985)
 Beach Head II (C64, 1985)
 221b Baker Street (C64, 1986)
 Solo Flight (C64, 1986)
 Big Bird's Hide and Speak (NES, 1990)
 Mickey's Jigsaw Puzzles (DOS, 1991)

Products

 ES1868 AudioDrive
 ES9218P SABRE high fidelity system-on-chip; 32-bit stereo mobile digital-to-analog converter with 2 Volt headphone amplifier.

Present day
Most recently, ESS SABRE DACs are used in the LG V10 smartphone, with a quad DAC configuration present in the V10's successor LG V20. A slightly upgraded version of the same DAC in the V20, the SABRE ES9218P, is used in the V30 as well as the V40 ThinQ. High end home and portable audio players come with ESS DAC chips. 

The luxury Sennheiser HE 1 electrostatic headphone utilizes 8 internal DACs of the SABRE ES9018.

See also
 Covox Speech Thing

References

External links
 Mediaplayer with most game speech samples from ESS
 Speech Box - Commodore Zone about ESS
 Commodore Zone about Sensory Inc.
 A 1985 article from Commodore User about speech in computer games, with some 2006 additions

Companies established in 1984
Companies based in Berkeley, California
Companies based in Fremont, California
Technology companies based in the San Francisco Bay Area